Zheng Yunduan ( 1327 – 1356) was a Chinese poet in the Yuan Dynasty, whose stylename was Zhengshu.

Her family came from Suzhu and was known for its scholars. Zheng Yunduan's father and brothers were all teachers.

References
"Zheng Yunduan", Silkqin.com, last accessed June 8, 2007

Chinese women poets
Yuan dynasty poets
1356 deaths
1320s births
14th-century Chinese women writers
14th-century Chinese writers
14th-century writers
Writers from Suzhou
Poets from Jiangsu